Felicia Donceanu (28 January 1931 – 21 January 2022) was a Romanian painter, sculptor, and composer.

Life and career
Donceanu was born in Bacău on 28 January 1931. She originally planned to be a stage director, but became interested in music and studied composition at the Ciprian Porumbescu Conservatory in Bucharest (now  the National University of Music) with Mihail Jora. After completing her studies in 1956, she worked as an editor for ESPLA until 1958, and then for Editura Muzicala until 1966. After leaving her editorial position, she worked full-time as a composer, producing works that have been performed internationally. She was married with poet Alexandru Voitin. Donceanu died in Drăgoești on 21 January 2022, at the age of 90.

Honors and awards
 Honorable mention, International Composition Competition in Mannheim, 1961
 Romanian Union of Composers’ prize in 1984, 1984?, 1986, 1988, 1993, 1996, and 1997
 Order of Cultural Merit, 1981
 Romanian Academy George Enescu prize, 1984

Works
Donceanu composed for stage plays and instrumental ensemble, but has focused mostly on chamber works. Her music is influenced by Romanian folk music, sometimes featuring traditional folk instruments. Selected works include:
 Arie de Concert (1973) for baritone and orchestra
 Măiastra (1973) for soprano, chorus, and string orchestra
 Picolicomando (1984) for tenor, children's chorus, organ, violin, and percussion
 Yolanda (1993) for soprano and orchestra
 Rugăciunea Domnească (1992) for voice, string orchestra, and percussion
 Rugăciunea Domnească (1998) for male chorus, string orchestra, and percussion
 Invocatio (1999) with Biblical texts and fragments of verses by Ovid, scored for soprano, piano, violin, and chamber orchestra
 Clopote la soroc (1999) a cantata for SATB chorus and orchestra
 Retro-Tango, for bassoon ensemble
 Inscription on a Mast for harp
 Odinioară, song-cycle for mezzo-soprano and piano
 Mărgele (Beads) (1962) four songs to verses by Tudor Arghezi
 Trei Cântece pentru Til (1964) to verses by George Călinescu
 Dor I for contralto
 Dor II for contralto
 Imagini pe versuri de Eminescu (Pictures on Verses of Eminescu) (1963–1965) for soprano
 Cu Penetul (With Plumage)
 Mărturisiri (Confessions), cycle of five songs for bass-baritone to poems by Alexandru Voitin, from 1975 to 1978 and 1986
 Cântece de fată frumoasă 
 Cântând cu Ienăchiţă Văcărescu
 Sincron
 Ponti Euxini Clepsydra (1971) for soprano, clarinet, oboe, percussion, and harp
 Mai sunt încă roze (1972), to texts by Macedonski, is a five-song work for soprano and instrumental ensemble
 Two Serenades (1973) for baritone, flute, and harp, to verses by Baconski
 Cântece de fată frumoasă (1976) three-movement work for mezzo-soprano, English horn, and marimba
 Cântând cu Ienăchiţă Văcărescu (1983) for soprano, lute, viola da gamba, flute, harpsichord, and percussion, text from Ienăchiţă Văcărescu
 Abţibilder după Tristan Tzara (1996) semi-staged work for soprano, harpsichord, and two viola da gamba
 Cutia cu surprise … şi pentru oameni încrutaţi (The Box with Surprises) (1998) for soprano, two viola da gamba, harpsichord, piano, and puppets
 Tablouri vivante (Living Tableaux) (1999), for voice and instruments

Her work has been recorded and issued on CD, including:
 Polhymnia – Sacrée et Profane

References

1931 births
2022 deaths
20th-century classical composers
20th-century Romanian painters
20th-century Romanian sculptors
20th-century Romanian women artists
20th-century women composers
21st-century Romanian women artists
Enescu Prize winners
Women classical composers
National University of Music Bucharest alumni
People from Bacău
Romanian classical composers
Romanian women painters
Romanian women sculptors
Burials at Bellu Cemetery